Rikke Svane (born 26 January 1976 in Aarhus, Denmark) is a Danish dressage rider  Rikke competed at the 2018 World Equestrian Games and at the 2015 European Dressage Championships with her black Trakhener stallion Finckenstein TSF. She is based in Denmark.

References

Living people
1976 births
Danish female equestrians
Danish dressage riders
Sportspeople from Aarhus